Paolo Sabak (born 10 February 1999) is a Belgian professional footballer who plays as an attacking midfielder for K.S.C. Lokeren-Temse.

Club career

Genk
Sabak is a youth product of K.R.C. Genk. He made his Belgian Pro League debut at 21 August 2016 in a 0–3 away win against Sporting Lokeren. He replaced Alejandro Pozuelo after 80 minutes.

Forge FC
On 23 April 2020, Sabak signed for Canadian Premier League side Forge FC. He made his debut on August 13 in the 2020 season opener against Cavalry FC. He scored his first goal for Forge in his third match, scoring a penalty against HFX Wanderers on August 19.

K.S.C. Lokeren-Temse
In 2022, Sabak signed for Belgian Division 2 side K.S.C. Lokeren-Temse on a one-year contract with an option.

Personal life
Sabak was born in Belgium, and is of Assyrian descent.

Career statistics

References

External links

1999 births
Living people
Association football midfielders
Belgian footballers
Place of birth missing (living people)
Belgian people of Assyrian/Syriac descent
Belgian expatriate footballers
Expatriate footballers in the Netherlands
Belgian expatriate sportspeople in the Netherlands
Expatriate soccer players in Canada
Belgian expatriate sportspeople in Canada
K.R.C. Genk players
NEC Nijmegen players
Forge FC players
Belgian Pro League players
Eerste Divisie players
Canadian Premier League players
Belgium youth international footballers